Jorge Mendoza (born 15 May 1989) is a Paraguayan international footballer who plays for Guaireña, as a midfielder.

Career
Mendoza has played for Guaraní since 2009.

He made his international debut for Paraguay in 2012.

References

External links

1989 births
Living people
Paraguayan footballers
Paraguayan expatriate footballers
Paraguay international footballers
Club Guaraní players
Club Olimpia footballers
Associação Atlética Ponte Preta players
Club Sol de América footballers
Paraguayan Primera División players
Campeonato Brasileiro Série A players
Association football midfielders
Paraguayan expatriate sportspeople in Brazil
Expatriate footballers in Brazil